Stenandrium thomense, synonym Stenandriopsis thomensis, is a species of flowering plants of the family Acanthaceae. It is a low herb with purple flowers. The leaves are white beneath.It occurs in Nigeria, Cameroon and São Tomé and Príncipe. It was first described as Crossandra thomensis in 1935 by Milne-Redhead.

References

Acanthaceae
Flora of Cameroon
Flora of Nigeria
Flora of São Tomé and Príncipe